Ett skepp kommer lastat ("A Ship Arrives Loaded", also the name of a Swedish children's game) was the 1982 edition of Sveriges Radio's Christmas Calendar.

Plot
Together with singer and songwriter Finn Zetterholm, a group of first-graders from the Kungsätra School in Skärholmen sing songs. When opening a calendar window, they talk about the calendar window images. On Christmas Eve, Finn and the children celebrate with most of the characters from the calendar in the square, and Dracula has a toothache.

References
 

1982 radio programme debuts
1982 radio programme endings
Sveriges Radio's Christmas Calendar